The 1936 Victorian Sporting Car Club Trophy was a motor race held at the Phillip Island circuit in Victoria, Australia on 1 January 1936.
It was open to all cars, regardless of engine capacity. 
The race was staged over 35 laps of the 3 1/3 mile course, a total distance of 116 miles.	
It was contested on a handicap basis with the first starter, "W Gum", commencing the race 20 minutes and 25 seconds before the last starter, Les Burrows.

The race was won by Harry Beith, driving a Chrysler off a handicap of 2 minutes 20 seconds.

Results

Notes
 Lap length: 3 and 1/3 miles
 Race distance: 35 laps, 116 miles
 Entries: 20
 Scratchings: 3
 Starters: 17	
 Classified finishers (within time limit): 8
 Winners average speed: 64.1 mph
 Fastest Time: Harry Beith	
 Fastest lap: Les Burrows, 2 m 25 s (67 mph) (new lap record)
 Attendance: Nearly 10,000

References

External links
 New Year's Day Race at Cowes, The Referee, Thursday 21 November 1935, Page 16
 Olympic advertisement, The Age  Thursday 2 January 1936, page 3
  New Year's Day at Cowes, Weekly Times, Saturday 11 January 1936, Page 29

Victorian Sporting Car Club Trophy
Motorsport at Phillip Island